List of airports in Tanzania is a partial list of aerodromes (airports and airstrips) in Tanzania.
 
The ICAO airport codes for Tanzania begin with the letters "HT".

Airport names in bold have scheduled commercial airline service(s).

Runway information is for the longest runway and/or the one with better surface (when more than one is available).

Airports

Tanzania Mainland

The mainland (excluding Zanzibar) has 27 airports. The Tanzania Airports Authority (TAA) operates all the airports except for Kilimanjaro International, which is managed by the state-owned Kilimanjaro Airport Development Company (KADCO).

Zanzibar

Airports in the Zanzibar Archipelago are under the jurisdiction of the Zanzibar Airports Authority.

Airstrips

* TAA Tanzania Airports Authority, TANAPA Tanzania National Parks Authority, TPDC Tanzania Petroleum Development Corporation, MNRT Ministry of Natural Resources and Tourism

Military airbases
 Mwanza Air Force Base, Mwanza
 Ngerengere Air Force Base, Morogoro Region
 Ukonga Air Force Base, Dar es Salaam

Proposed airports
 Msalato International Airport, Dodoma (capital)
 Kajunguti International Airport, Kagera Region
 Serengeti International Airport, Mugumu

See also
 Transport in Tanzania
 List of airports by ICAO code: H#HT - Tanzania
 Wikipedia: WikiProject Aviation/Airline destination lists: Africa#Tanzania, United Republic of

References

External links
 
 Great Circle Mapper: Airports in Tanzania - IATA and ICAO codes

Tanzania
 
Airports
Airports
Tanzania